Death in Texas is a 2020 American action film written and directed by Scott Windhauser. It stars− Ronnie Gene Blevins, Bruce Dern, Lara Flynn Boyle and Stephen Lang.

Cast
Bruce Dern as Reynolds
Ronnie Gene Blevins as Billy Walker
Lara Flynn Boyle
Stephen Lang
John Ashton

Production
The film was shot in El Paso, Texas and Las Cruces, New Mexico from October to November 2019.

Release
The film premiered at the 14th Rockport Film Festival in Rockport, Texas in November 2020.

References

External links
 

American action drama films
Films shot in New Mexico
Films shot in Texas
Films shot in El Paso, Texas
2020s English-language films
2020s American films